Craig Kopczak (born 20 December 1986) is a Wales international rugby league footballer who plays as a  for Featherstone Rovers in the Betfred Championship. 

He previously played for the Bradford Bulls in the Super League, and on loan from Bradford at Halifax in 2008's National League One. Kopczak has also played for the Huddersfield Giants, Wakefield Trinity and the Salford Red Devils in the Super League.

Background
Craig Kopczak was born in Bradford, West Yorkshire, England.

Craig is married to Victoria and they have two children, Poppy & Harvey

Playing career

Bradford
Kopczak made his Bradford  début in 2006. He spent at period in 2008 on loan at Halifax, and later established himself as an important first-team player for Bradford. He scored his first try for the club against St Helens in 2008, and scored his first career hat-trick against Wakefield Trinity

Huddersfield
Kopczak signed a three-year deal with Huddersfield after he left the Bradford club. He played for the club for three years and was a member of the team that won the League Leaders' Shield in 2013.

Salford
Kopczak joined Salford ahead of the 2016 Super League season.

Featherstone Rovers
On 5 December 2020, it was announced that he would join Featherstone Rovers for the 2021 season.
On 28 May 2022, he played for Featherstone in their 2022 RFL 1895 Cup final loss against Leigh.

Statistics

Wales
Although born in England, Craig represents Wales at international level due to his heritage. He made his Wales début in 2007, and scored his first Wales try in a match against England in 2009.

He featured for Wales in the 2011 Four Nations.
He was Wales player of the tournament during the Four Nations, whilst also winning Bradford's Player of the Year 2011.

He captained Wales in the 2013 Rugby League World Cup and 2015 European Cup. He captained the team again in the following year's 2017 World Cup qualifiers.

Craig retired from International Rugby League in 2018.

References

External links
Wakefield Trinity profile
Salford Red Devils profile
(archived by web.archive.org) Bradford Bulls profile
SL profile
(archived by web.archive.org) Statistics at rlwc2017.com

1986 births
Living people
Bradford Bulls players
English people of Polish descent
English people of Welsh descent
English rugby league players
Featherstone Rovers players
Halifax R.L.F.C. players
Huddersfield Giants players
People from Eccleshill, West Yorkshire
Rugby league players from Bradford
Rugby league props
Rugby league second-rows
Wakefield Trinity players
Wales national rugby league team captains
Wales national rugby league team players